Richard Eric Onslow Long, 3rd Viscount Long,  (22 August 1892 – 12 January 1967) was a British Conservative Party politician and Territorial Army officer.

Background
Long was a member of a long-established Wiltshire family. He was the younger son of Walter Long, 1st Viscount Long, by Lady Dorothy Blanche, daughter of Richard Boyle, 9th Earl of Cork. He was the younger brother of Brigadier-General Walter Long, and the nephew of Lord Gisborough. He was educated at Harrow School.

In 1922 Long was initiated into Freemasonry in the Chaloner Lodge No. 2644, meeting at Melksham. Later he also joined the Lodge of Assistance No. 2773, meeting in central London. He became a Justice of the Peace in 1923.

Political career
Long was elected to the House of Commons as Member of Parliament (MP) for Westbury at a by-election in 1927, following the death of the sitting Conservative MP Walter Shaw. He was re-elected at the 1929 general election, but stood down at the 1931 election.

Military career
Long served in World War I, when he was mentioned in dispatches. Between the wars he reached the rank of Major in the part-time Royal Wiltshire Yeomanry. He served again in World War II, becoming Commander of 329 Battery in 32nd Searchlight Regiment, Royal Artillery (7th City of London) in 1941, based at Carlton Hall near Saxmundham, Suffolk. He was asked to resign in 1942.

After the war, he became Honorary Colonel of 604 Searchlight Regiment, Royal Artillery (Royal Fusiliers).

Personal life 
In 1944, his nephew Walter Long, 2nd Viscount Long was killed in action in the war.  Walter had no male heirs, so Long succeeded to his nephew's titles, becoming the 3rd Viscount Long. Prior to this he had been generally known as "Major Eric Long". In 1946 he was appointed Deputy Lieutenant of Wiltshire.

Lord Long married Gwendolyn Hague-Cook in 1916, and they had four children:
 Walter Reginald Basil Long, born 13 December 1918, served in World War II as Lieutenant, Royal Artillery, drowned on active service in Greece, 28 April 1941
 Noreen Long, born 21 January 1921, married Major John Cairns Bartholomew, Royal Wiltshire Yeomanry
 Richard Gerald Long, born 29 January 1929, who succeeded his father as 4th Viscount Long
 John Hume Long, born 4 July 1930.
Gwendolyn died in 1959.

Viscount Long died at a Bath hospital on 12 January 1967, aged 74, and is buried in the family vault at West Ashton, Wiltshire. According to his obituary in The Times, he once described the Socialists as 'dangerous beasts'. When women peers were introduced into the House of Lords he said: "I will of course speak to them if they thrust their presence in my face, but otherwise I will do my best to overlook them".  He said of women that they had "not a clue" about politics.

Awards
Viscount Long held the following awards:
 Knight Commander, Order of George I of Greece
 Freedom of the City of Athens (1947)
 Territorial Decoration

Further reading 
Inheriting the Earth: The Long Family's 500 Year Reign in Wiltshire; Cheryl Nicol

Notes

References 
 Burke's Peerage, Baronetage and Knightage, 100th Edn, London, 1953.
 C. Digby Planck, The Shiny Seventh: History of the 7th (City of London) Battalion London Regiment, London: Old Comrades' Association, 1946/Uckfield: Naval & Military Press, 2002, .

External links 
 

1892 births
1967 deaths
People educated at Harrow School
Conservative Party (UK) MPs for English constituencies
Royal Artillery officers
Viscounts in the Peerage of the United Kingdom
Deputy Lieutenants of Wiltshire
Royal Wiltshire Yeomanry officers
Eric
UK MPs 1924–1929
UK MPs 1929–1931
UK MPs who inherited peerages
People from Wiltshire
Place of birth missing
Conservative Party (UK) hereditary peers
London Regiment officers
British Army officers
British Army personnel of World War I
British Army personnel of World War II